Frederick Henry Mazurek (born March 21, 1943) is a former American football flanker in the National Football League. He played for the Washington Redskins.

Biography
Mazurek received a scholarship from the University of Pittsburgh and played as the starting quarterback for the Pitt Panthers from 1961 to 1965. Competing for the national championship in 1963 against Navy, he and his team lost 7 to 6 during a game in which Roger Staubach quarterbacked for the Navy team.

Mazurek also played baseball, and was an All-American center fielder for the baseball team at the University of Pittsburgh.

Personal life
Mazurek's younger sister Bernadette Mazurek Melnyk is dean of the College of Nursing at The Ohio State University.

References

1943 births
Living people
American football wide receivers
American people of Polish descent
People from Uniontown, Pennsylvania
Pittsburgh Panthers baseball players
Pittsburgh Panthers football players
Players of American football from Pennsylvania
Sportspeople from the Pittsburgh metropolitan area
Washington Redskins players